The 1920 Copa del Rey Final was the 20th final of the Spanish cup competition, the Copa del Rey. The final was played at El Molinón, in Gijón, on 2 May 1920, in front of an attendance of 10,000 spectators, who saw FC Barcelona beat Athletic Bilbao 2–0, thus winning their fourth cup title. The goals were scored in the second-half by Vicente Martínez and Paulino Alcántara.

The final was attended by a large number of supporters from the Basque region, who arrived in Gijon by train. The match was surrounded by controversy due to referee Enrique Bertrán's performance, who annulled a goal by a penalty awarded to Athletic Bilbao, alleging that scorer Germán Echevarría had shot before he gave the order to do it. Nevertheless, the penalty was not kicked for a second time, as ruled on the laws of the game. The referee was also criticized for allowing misconduct from both teams.

Match details 

|valign="top" width="50%"|

|}

See also
Athletic–Barcelona clásico

References

1920
Copa
FC Barcelona matches
Athletic Bilbao matches
May 1920 sports events